Industry House is a high-rise located in Kolkata, India. It is located in the central part of the city beside Camac Street.

Details
Industry House is one of the earliest high-rises in the city. It is a commercial building and was built in 1980 by the Birlas. The building houses numerous offices, most of them of Birla Group companies. Though the outside appearance looks odd, but it is one of the best commercial buildings in the city with world-class interior infrastructure and design.

See also
 List of tallest buildings in Kolkata

References

Office buildings in Kolkata
Skyscraper office buildings in India